Nəzirli (also, Nazirli and Nazırlı) is a village and municipality in the Barda Rayon of Azerbaijan.  It has a population of 710.

References 

Populated places in Barda District